Special Kiss is the first album by Gumball. It was released in 1991 on the Primo Scree label. It contains contributions from Thurston Moore of Sonic Youth and Teenage Fanclub.

Critical reception
Trouser Press called the album "a locomotive blur of abrasive pop and gnarly guitar psychosis." Spin wrote that "some tracks rock out a la Black Sabbath, some slam your head against the wall courtesy of blazing hardcore, and some make your stomach sick with wimpy pop."

Track listing 
 "This Town" - (Fleming)
 "All The Time" - (Fleming)
 "Window Pain" - (Fleming)
 "Wake Up" - (Gumball)
 "Summer Days" - (Fleming)
 "Yellow Pants" - (Fleming)
 "Restless" - (Fleming)
 "Gone Too Far" - (Gumball)
 "Gettysburg" - (Gumball)
 "Alternate Feed" - (Fleming)
 "You Know" - (Teenage Fanclub and Gumball)
 "Pre" - (Gumball)
 "High Or Low"
 "Gettysburg (Twister Mix)" - (Gumball)

Personnel 
Don Fleming - vocals, guitar, producer
Jay Spiegel - drums, vocals ("Gone Too Far")
Eric Vermillion - bass, vocals ("Wake Up", "You Know") 
Raymond McGinley - guitar, background vocals ("You Know")
Brendan O'Hare - background vocals ("You Know")
Norman Blake - background vocals ("You Know")
Gerard Love - background vocals ("You Know")
Paul Crisholm - bass ("You Know")
Thurston Moore - keyboards ("Gettysburg")
Technical
Jim Waters - engineer
James Kavoussi - engineer
Wharton Tiers - engineer

References 

1991 debut albums
albums produced by Don Fleming (musician)